GETCO may refer to:

 Global Electronic Trading Company, an electronic trading firm now merged into KCG Holdings
 Gujarat Energy Transmission Corporation, an electrical power company in Gujarat, India